Insolicorypha is a genus of polychaetes known from the Middle Cambrian Burgess Shale. A single specimen of Insolicorypha is known from the Greater Phyllopod bed.  The genus was described by Conway Morris (1979) and re-examined by Eibye-Jacobsen (2004).

References

External links 
 
 Photograph of fossil (lo res)

Polychaete genera
Burgess Shale animals
Prehistoric annelid genera
Cambrian genus extinctions